The 1996 Brickyard 400, the 3rd running of the event, was a NASCAR Winston Cup Series race held on August 3, 1996, at the Indianapolis Motor Speedway in Speedway, Indiana. The race was the nineteenth of the 1996 NASCAR Winston Cup Series season.

Race 
Five laps into the race, the first caution flew for a crash involving Greg Sacks, Robert Pressley, Ricky Craven, Dave Marcis, and Bobby Hillin Jr. On lap 23, pole-sitter Jeff Gordon cut his right-front tire and hit the wall; Gordon finished 37th. Subsequently, Johnny Benson Jr. took the lead, and led a race-high 70 laps. Ernie Irvan took the lead from Benson on lap 108, and on lap 126, an error made during a pit stop dropped Benson to 13th. Meanwhile, Dale Jarrett took the lead from his Robert Yates Racing teammate Irvan, who reclaimed the lead on lap 139 after passing Jarrett in turn 3. Jarrett managed to pass Irvan in turn 2 of lap 154, and kept the lead after the race ended under caution due to Pressley crashing in turn 4 on lap 159. Irvan finished second, followed by Terry Labonte, Mark Martin, Morgan Shepherd, Ricky Rudd, Rusty Wallace, Benson, Rick Mast and Bill Elliott.

Afterwards, Jarrett and crew chief Todd Parrott kissed the yard of bricks at the start/finish line, a practice that has continued to be performed in NASCAR, and was eventually also done by Gil de Ferran after his win in the Indianapolis 500 in 2003.

In the points standings after the race, Terry Labonte led with 2792 points, Dale Earnhardt trailed with 2731 points; Jarrett (2729), Jeff Gordon (2688), and Ricky Rudd (2415) rounded out the Top 5.

Results

Qualifying

Race results

Standings after the race

References 

Brickyard 400
Brickyard 400
NASCAR races at Indianapolis Motor Speedway